Mallosia jakowlewi is a species of beetle in the family Cerambycidae. It was described by Semenov in 1895. It is known from Iran.

References

Saperdini
Beetles described in 1895